Amal Bou Saâda, known as A Bou Saâda or simply ABS for short, is an Algerian football club based in Bou Saâda. The club was founded in 1941 and its colors are green and white. Their home stadium, Mokhtar Abdelatif Stadium, has a capacity of some 5,000 spectators. The club is currently playing in the Algerian Ligue 2.

Current squad

References

External links 

Football clubs in Algeria
Association football clubs established in 1940
M'Sila Province
1940 establishments in Algeria
Sports clubs in Algeria